Fair Representation Act may refer to:

 Fair Representation Act (Canada)
 Fair Representation Act (United States)